Jordanelle Reservoir is a reservoir in Wasatch County, Utah, United States, just north of Heber City.

Jordanelle Reservoir is fed and drained primarily by the Provo River, and is impounded by the Jordanelle Dam, an earthen dam. The construction of the dam resulted in the reroutings of both U.S. Route 40 and U.S. Route 189 (which now run concurrently over the summit of nearby mountains) and the submergence of the towns of Keetley, Hailstone, and Jordanelle.

Jordanelle State Park
Construction of the dam started on June 27, 1987, and was completed on April 12, 1993. Jordanelle State Park opened on June 29, 1995. Construction of the dam was challenged by several groups. Conservationists wanted to maintain the natural state of the Provo River. Because of this, a large area at the foot of the dam was converted into an artificial wetland. Other groups were concerned that the site was geologically flawed, citing the catastrophic failure of the Teton Dam in Idaho in 1976. Mining interests in nearby Park City were also concerned, fearing that the reservoir would flood sections of the Ontario silver mine.

During the summer months, Jordanelle is a destination for triathletes and runners alike. Because of the State Park's rugged terrain on the Rock Cliff side, sponsors host sprint triathlons in addition to  races and ultra marathons.

See also

 List of dams and reservoirs in Utah
 List of Utah State Parks

References

External links 

 Blue Ribbon Fisheries - Jordanelle Reservoir
 Jordanelle State Park
 Utah Outdoor Activities
  
 Jordanelle Fishing Info

Reservoirs in Utah
State parks of Utah
Lakes of Wasatch County, Utah
Buildings and structures in Wasatch County, Utah
Protected areas of Wasatch County, Utah
Dams in Utah
United States Bureau of Reclamation dams
Dams completed in 1992
Constructed wetlands
1992 establishments in Utah